Lime Rock may refer to:

United States
Lime Rock (Salisbury), a neighborhood in the village of Lakeville, Connecticut
Lime Rock Park, a race track in Lime Rock, Connecticut
Lime Rock, Rhode Island, a village in Lincoln, Rhode Island
Lime Rock (island), an island in Narragansett Bay in the state of Rhode Island
Lime Rock, Wisconsin, a ghost town